The 5th Writers Guild of America Awards honored the best film writers of 1952. Winners were announced in 1953.

Winners & Nominees

Film
Winners are listed first highlighted in boldface.

Special Awards
Laurel Award for Screen Writing Achievement

Sonya Levien

References

External links
WGA.org

1952
W
1952 in American cinema